The Bedford Handbook is a guide written by Diana Hacker, now in its eleventh edition, that provides basic explanations of proper English grammar, composition, citation, and textual analysis. The guide includes a number of sample texts (including essays) and illustrations throughout its sections. It also covers the concept of plagiarism. 

The Bedford Handbook contains guides to the MLA, APA, and Chicago citation styles and includes examples of each style in essay form. The book is paired with a companion website that has exercises and more writing models. The hardback is 820 pages and the paperback is 960 pages and are published by United States publisher Bedford/St. Martin's.

References 

Style guides for American English
Macmillan Publishers books